Dadar East is a monorail station of the Mumbai Monorail located beside the famous Pratipandharpur Vitthal Temple on GD Ambedkar Marg in the Dadar Parsi Colony suburb of Mumbai, India.

There is demand for Renaming Dadar (East) monorail station into Vitthal Mandir monorail station because of Vitthal Mandir is nearby at this monorail station so it would preferable for tourists.

References

Mumbai Monorail stations
Railway stations in India opened in 2019